A chocoholic is a person who craves or compulsively consumes chocolate. The word "chocoholic" was first used in 1968, according to Merriam-Webster. It is a portmanteau of "chocolate" and "alcoholic". The term is used loosely or humorously to describe a person who is inordinately fond of chocolate; however, there is medical evidence to support the existence of actual addiction to chocolate.  Psychoactive constituents of chocolate that trigger a ‘feel-good’ reaction for the consumer include tryptophan and phenylethylamine, which may contribute to cravings and addiction-like responses, particularly in people with specific genetic alleles. The quantity of sugars used in chocolate confections also impacts the psychoactive effects of chocolate.

Although the concept of a chocolate addiction is still controversial in the medical literature, chocolate (especially dark chocolate) is considered to have effects on mood, and chocolate confectioneries almost always top the list of foods people say they crave. The craving can be so strong in some cases that chocoholics may experience withdrawal symptoms if the craving is not fulfilled.

Addiction
There are two factors that contribute to the addictive nature of chocolate. The first is the pharmacological ingredients, and the second is the additives. The essential components of addiction are intense craving for something and a loss of control over its use. Academic research has shown that people can exhibit both of these components in relation to food, particularly food that contains sugar or fat. Since chocolate contains both, it is often used in studies of food addiction.

Criticism
A study in the journal Nutrients has shown that despite some evidence that this type of addiction exists, there is no formal diagnosis given in the Diagnostic and Statistical Manual of Mental Disorders, Fifth Edition (DSM-V). It is known that chocolate consumption does not activate the shell of the nucleus accumbens, as seen in those with substance use disorders.

Genetics 
A study published in the journal Cell Metabolism proved a correlation between the FGF21 gene and a liking for sweet foods. Other research has upheld one of the variants of the FGF21 gene were 20% more likely to crave sugary foods. The FGF21 gene also moderates appetite and controls insulin resistance. The FGF21 gene is also known to be associated with the sweet tooth.

It is also known that there is an association between the FTO gene and intake of sugar and caffeine. The FTO gene works to regulate the body's energy usage. Some variants of the FTO gene play a major role in the connectivity in the reward circuit of the meso-striato prefrontal regions, which act to process information and focus one's attention, and are linked to disorders such as addiction. Studies have found that the presence of chromosome 16 can uphold genetic variations that influence the intake of sweet foods, such as chocolate.

The dopamine receptor D2 is also linked to addictive behaviours such as substance use disorders. Addiction may occur when there is a deficit in the number of dopamine 2 receptors, which gives one the ability to experience pleasure.

A study in the Journal of Psychoactive Drugs has shown that the biological children of alcoholic parents are at a higher risk to inherit a preference for sweet foods, including chocolate.

People develop the preference for sweet-tasting foods from birth, as it is related to the taste of mother's milk and the way it provides a sense of calmness to newborns. People also quickly learn to prefer energy-rich foods, such as chocolate, which the appetite learns to want, even when not hungry.

Craving

Even scientists who doubt the existence of true addiction agree that chocolate craving is real. Chocolate is one of the most commonly craved foods due to a variety of reasons. The pleasant taste creates a pleasurable experience for the consumer. The combination of the sweetness, smoothness and creaminess in terms of both taste and smell creates an ideal sensory attraction. Chocolate's high energy density also contributes to the consumer experience. This desire is created through a motivational circuitry in the brain that influences behaviours without conscious awareness, which generates a craving for chocolate. The consumption of chocolate creates a positive emotional experience, providing comfort and often used for alleviating stress and negative emotions. Chocolate is known to regulate an imbalance in the functioning of the neurotransmitter, serotonin, a factor influencing emotional states. Chocolate's fat and energy contents makes the food a key preference when under stress.

Chocolate cravings are also as a result of nutrient deficits. Cravings can be a result of needing to increase magnesium levels to correct an imbalance in neurotransmitters that work to regulate disposition and digestion. An imbalance of blood sugar levels also increases cravings. The releasing of insulin to lower blood sugar when sugar is ingested results in a long-term imbalance which results in cravings for sugar in order to raise energy.

Women are especially affected. Fluctuating hormone levels among women is also known to contribute towards chocolate cravings. Studies have shown that those during menstruation or suffering from premenstrual syndrome (PMS) recorded more severe cravings for foods with high sugar and fat contents, such as chocolate, compared to women at different stages of the menstruation cycle. Magnesium deficits are also known to enhance the symptoms of premenstrual syndrome (PMS), which contributes to a higher chocolate craving.

Cravings for chocolate can also be triggered or stimulated by the senses. The odour of chocolate is known to increase brain activity and cravings when compared with tests with no odour involved. For those who crave chocolate regularly, the sight of chocolate activates the orbitofrontal cortex and ventral striatum, both associated with reward-related behaviour and decision making.

Management techniques

Blood sugar

Implementation of nutritional changes can assist in overcoming a chocolate addiction. Consumption of foods such as proteins and healthy fats prevent large amounts of insulin to be released. The release of excessive amounts of insulin results in chocolate cravings. The amino acid within protein assists in building chemicals such as dopamine, which can help to reduce chocolate cravings. Foods containing fibre can also assist to balance blood sugar and slow digestion. Increasing consumption of foods rich in iron, works to decrease the body's need for an energy boost through sugar. This can include foods such as beans, lentils and leafy dark green vegetables. Eating regular meals also stabilises blood sugar levels. Adhering to a nutritious meal plan with planned meals and snacks assists in reducing the likelihood of chocolate cravings.

Chocolate cravings can also be linked to stress. Stress raises blood sugar levels through the hormone cortisol and the releasing of glucose from the liver. A lack of sleep also results in increased sugar consumption as people seek to overcome fatigue. Increasing the number of hours of sleep can assist to reduce the need to consume chocolate.

Studies have shown that consuming artificial sweeteners such as aspartame, saccharin, and sucralose increase chocolate cravings. This is due to the fact that they are equally sweet and encourage a sugar dependence.

Reversing an insulin resistance can also work to curb cravings for chocolate. This can be achieved through the consumption of substances such as cinnamon (which also may be used as a natural sugar substitute), ginger, and turmeric, that stimulates the absorption of glucose in the body.

Caffeine 

Introducing substitute products into diets can assist in reducing the craving for chocolate. This could include products such as carob. Carob does not contain theobromine or caffeine, both addictive methylxanthine substances. However, 100 grams carob contains 49.1 grams sugars.

Cause by ingredients

Cocoa bean

Chocolate liquor is produced from cocoa beans that have been fermented, dried, roasted, and separated from their skins.  The beans are ground into cocoa mass (cocoa paste).  The mass is melted to become the liquor, and the liquor is either separated into cocoa solids and cocoa butter, or cooled and molded into blocks of raw chocolate. Its main use (often with additional cocoa butter) is in making chocolate.

Cocoa solids

Cocoa powder contains several substances that can make it feel "addictive". However, theobromine is the primary compound found in cocoa. Also, dark chocolate contains higher amounts of these substances due to its higher cocoa content.

 Anandamide: Binds to receptors in the brain called the cannabinoid receptor. The presence of anandamide imitates the psychoactive effects similar to cannabis. Anandamide is also known to regulate mood and reduce anxiety. Also, dark chocolate also contains higher amounts of anandamide due to its higher cocoa content.
 Methylxanthines: Caffeine and theobromine which act as an energizer and impact performance.
 Caffeine: 10 grams unsweetened cocoa solids contains 23 mg caffeine. Consumption of 100 mg caffeine (or 43 grams cocoa solids) per day may cause low-dose symptoms of caffeinism.
 Theobromine: Per 50 g, dark chocolate also contains up to 220 mg of theobromine, compared to 75 mg in milk chocolate. Anecdotal evidence suggests that long-term use of 600 mg theobromine may induce withdrawal symptoms such as headache, muscle tension, and lethargy that can be reversed with 200 mg.
 Precursors to neurotransmitters, and neurotransmitters: 
 Dopamine precursors
 10 grams unsweetened cocoa solids contains 94 mg phenylalanine.
 10 grams unsweetened cocoa solids contains 74 mg tyrosine.
 Phenethylamine, a neurotransmitter from which amphetamine is derived. The characteristics of phenylethylamine have led to it being nicknamed "chocolate amphetamine”. Phenylethylamine triggers the "reward centres" in the brain, which entices repeat behaviour by the consumer. Phenylethylamine is also known to be released by the brain when we fall in love. In instances where chocolate consists of sufficient phenylethylamine, an addiction is likely to occur.
 Tryptophan: 10 grams unsweetened cocoa solids contains 29 mg tryptophan. An essential amino acid that is a precursor to serotonin, a neurotransmitter involved in regulating moods. This encourages the user to consume more chocolate due to its ability to make the consumer feel good.
 Salsolinol is a psychoactive compound found within chocolate which links to the dopamine receptor D2 and dopamine receptor D3 to the reward centres in the brain. Salsolinol is known to contribute towards a craving for chocolate. Studies have shown that the concentration of salsolinol in chocolate depends on its cocoa content. Milk chocolate types contains 30% cocoa, whilst dark chocolate types uphold 60-70% cocoa.

Heightened brain chemicals:
 Enkephalin: The natural brain chemical enkephalin is heightened when chocolate is consumed. Enkephalin triggers opioid receptors similar to those triggered by heroin and morphine use. This chemical leads the brain to desire more after chocolate is initially consumed, which can lead to addiction.

Cravings -- Dark chocolate may cause cravings if a person's micronutrient levels are low:
 Magnesium: Dark chocolate contains 252.2 mg/100 g, while milk chocolate containing 63 mg/100g. It is estimated that the magnesium levels in white chocolate is 12 times less compared to milk chocolate.

Cocoa butter
About 54–58% of the cocoa nibs is cocoa butter.

Raw chocolate

Raw chocolate contains cocoa solids and cocoa butter, from the cacao beans.

Dark chocolates' high caffeine and theobromine content can cause addiction due to both of their psychological effects. This is as a result of its higher content of cacao compared to other forms of chocolate. The amount of caffeine in dark chocolate can vary from 35 to 200 mg 50 g−1 while milk chocolate contains lower amounts of caffeine (14 mg 50 g−1).

Additives

The additives of sugar and fat in both milk chocolate and white chocolate trigger sweet taste receptors which releases dopamine and entice consumption to be repeated. This experience is seen to be more enjoyable compared to dark chocolate which upholds bitter aftertastes.

Alcohol

Chocolate liqueur is a liqueur made from a base liquor of whisky or vodka with chocolate as an additive. Unlike chocolate liquor, chocolate liqueur does contain alcohol and is often used as a sweetening ingredient in mixology, baking, and cooking.

Chronic alcohol abuse that results in significant health problems is the cause of alcoholism.

Sugars

Most products (except dark chocolate) includes both significant amount of sugars and the psychoactive substances' cocoa solids. In combining these two components, milk chocolate is the most preferred by consumers. Commercial products which most typically contains sugar may lead to addiction and continued use despite negative consequences.

Products with sugars, including milk sugar:
 White chocolate: White sugar, powdered milk.
 Milk chocolate: White sugar, powdered milk.
 Chocolate milk: Milk.
 Chocolate ice cream: Cream.

White chocolate does not contain cacao or cocoa solids, instead made up of cocoa butter, milk solids, sugar and fat. It is known that the fat and sugar content in white chocolate is what makes this chocolate addictive. In manufacturing white chocolate, the rough textures of the cocoa solids are removed, leaving the smoothness of the cocoa butter. This creates a pleasurable experience for the consumer as there is not grit left on the tongue. Refining the sugar in the mixture to remove any rough textures also creates a positive sensory experience for the consumer. These smoothing processes are referred to as conching. The ‘melt in your mouth’ aspect due to its high cocoa content also contributes to a craving for white chocolate.

History 

It is estimated that chocolate has been consumed for over 2000 years. Most of its history, it has been consumed as a liquid, with it only being developed into a powdered form in the mid 1800s. Throughout Europe during this time, chocolate was regarded as an exciting beverage, developing great popularity and desire by its consumers. In ancient Mexico, chocolate was served only to adult males such as government officials, military officers, priests and distinguished warriors. Chocolate was also seen as intoxicating and stimulating and therefore not appropriate of use by children and women. Ancient emperors such as Moctezuma II was said to utilise chocolate as an aphrodisiac, consuming large amounts before visiting his wives. Casanova also consumed the chocolate in liquid form before seeing his romantic partners. Chocolate is often referred to as the “love drug”, which began the trend of exchanging chocolates on Valentine's Day as early as the 17th century.

Chocolate and its psychological effects was kept a secret throughout its origin in Spain during the 16th century, until the early 17th century when Madrid became a hub for fashion and society. Visitors travelling throughout Spain came to discover the taste of chocolate. Spanish monks also taught visiting family members the habit of consuming hot chocolate and its health benefits. Early studies by Spanish monk Bernardino de Sahagún advised against overconsumption of cacao, reporting that large amounts of green cacao resulted in consumers feeling disorientated. He applauded smaller doses of chocolate, advising that chocolate consumed as a liquid resulted in consumers feeling revitalised.

Chocolate also had a significant medical use. The drinking of chocolate was seen to improve digestion and heavy stomachs as it was previously known to promote healthy gut bacteria. It was also utilised for treatment for those with wasting diseases such as tuberculosis. The strong taste of cacao was also used to hide the flavour of unpleasant tasting drugs which has developed into a modern view of “a little bit of chocolate makes the medicine go down". Chocolates use also extended to treating those with bloody dysentery.

Chocolate usage was also linked to its nutritional benefits. English soldiers based in Jamaica in the 17th century survived on cacao paste dissolved in water with sugar over long periods of time, without showing any decline in strength. It is also known that Indian women would consume it so frequently and in such large amounts that it would become a replacement for meat.

See also

Health effects of chocolate
Sugar addiction

References

External links

 

Chocolate
Eating behaviors of humans
1960s neologisms
Food and drink culture
Human behavior
Behavioral addiction
1968 neologisms